Moses Levy or Moses Levi, or variation, may refer to:

People
 Moses Levy (Pennsylvanian) (1757–1826), prominent Jew in Colonial America
 Moses Elias Levy (1782–1854), Jewish-Moroccan-American businessman and reformer
 Moses Levi, Chief Rabbi in Istanbul
 Moses Michael Levi Barrow (stagename: Shyne), Belizean politician and musician

Other uses
 Moses Levy Building, Greek Revival building in Charleston, South Carolina

See also

 Moïse Lévy, Rabbinic leader in the Democratic Republic of the Congo
 Moshe Levy (disambiguation), including Moishe Levi; an alternate spelling of Moses Levy
 Morris Levy (disambiguation); an anglicized form of Moses Levy
 Moses (disambiguation)
 Levy (disambiguation)
 Levi (disambiguation)